Virgile is a 1953 French comedy film directed by Carlo Rim and starring Robert Lamoureux, Yves Robert and Fernand Sardou.

The film's sets were designed by the art director Robert Clavel.

Main cast

References

Bibliography
 Alfred Krautz. International directory of cinematographers, set- and costume designers in film, Volume 4. Saur, 1984.

External links 
 

1953 films
French comedy films
1950s French-language films
1953 comedy films
Films directed by Carlo Rim
French black-and-white films
1950s French films